Alexandro da Silva Santos ( Leko; born March 23, 1985), better known as Leko, is a Brazilian striker who currently plays for Hong Kong First Division club Citizen.

Club career

East Bengal
In February Santos signed for Indian I-League club East Bengal and played his first game on March 6, 2011, in a 2–1 loss to Mumbai.

Sham Shui Po
Leko signed with Sham Shui Po on 5 January 2012.

Notes and references

External links

Leko at HKFA

1985 births
Living people
Brazilian footballers
Brazilian expatriate footballers
Association football forwards
Citizen AA players
Hong Kong First Division League players
Expatriate footballers in Hong Kong
Brazilian expatriate sportspeople in Hong Kong
East Bengal Club players
I-League players